WCAN may refer to:

WCAN (FM) (93.3 FM) in Canajoharie, New York, a broadcast relay station of WAMC in Albany, New York
WCAN-TV (channel 25), a former Milwaukee, Wisconsin television station which operated from 1953 to 1955
WSSP (1250 AM) in Milwaukee, Wisconsin, which held the WCAN call sign from 1952 to 1955 
WCAN (AM) (833 AM) a former Jacksonville, Florida radio station which held the WCAN call sign in 1922